The 2021–22 season was the 97th season in the existence of FC Luzern and the club's 26th consecutive season in the top flight of Swiss football. In addition to the domestic league, FC Luzern participated in this season's editions of the Swiss Cup and the UEFA Europa Conference League.

Players

First-team squad

Other players under contract

Out on loan

Transfers

Pre-season and friendlies

Competitions

Overall record

Swiss Super League

League table

Results summary

Results by round

Matches 
The league fixtures were announced on 24 June 2021.

Relegation play-offs

Swiss Cup

UEFA Europa Conference League

Third qualifying round 
The draw for the third qualifying round was held on 19 July 2021.

References

FC Luzern seasons
Luzern
2021–22 UEFA Europa Conference League participants seasons